Lupe Fiasco's Food & Liquor (commonly referred to as Food & Liquor) is the debut studio album by American rapper Lupe Fiasco, released on September 19, 2006, on 1st & 15th Entertainment and Atlantic Records.  The album features production from The Neptunes, Kanye West, Mike Shinoda, Craig Kallman, Prolyfic, Needlz, Soundtrakk, and Brandon Howard. Jay-Z, Chill, and Fiasco himself are credited as the executive producers for the album. Songs on the record discuss poverty, Islam, terrorism, racism, and individuality.

Originally, the album was reported to have debuted at number 12 on the Billboard 200; however, due to incomplete Nielsen SoundScan reports, the album actually debuted at number eight. The album received four Grammy Award nominations, including Grammy Award for Best Rap Album at the 49th Grammy Awards. "Daydreamin'", featuring Jill Scott, won Best Urban/Alternative Song at the 50th Grammy Awards. The album was digitally re-released on September 13, 2011, to mark its 5th anniversary; this version features four new tracks. On April 30, 2015, Lupe Fiasco released a music video for "Just Might Be O.K.", nine years after the album's original release.

Background and conception
At age 19, Fiasco was signed to Epic Records and was a member of a group called Da Pak. The group released one single before splitting up. He later signed a recording contract with Arista Records, but was dropped when president and chief executive officer (CEO) L. A. Reid was fired. In 2006, fellow rapper Jay-Z was impressed by Fiasco's feature on Kanye West's "Touch the Sky" and agreed to become the executive producer of the album.

The title of the album, (somewhat of a surprise for many coming from a Muslim) refers to the various Food and Liquor stores in Chicago neighborhoods. It also refers to the "constant tug of war between good (food) and evil (liquor)". The title is a philosophy that Fiasco believes about human nature. He went on to elaborate:

Prior to the release of Food & Liquor, Fiasco was one of Rolling Stone magazine's "List of Artists to Watch" in 2006. In April 2006, the entire album was leaked onto the Internet, which resulted in it being shelved. With the leak of the album, Fiasco was heralded as the potential "savior of hip hop" by critics, as well as fellow recording artists West and Williams. In response of the leak, Fiasco recorded additional songs for the album. Despite stating he would only work with Prolyfic and Soundtrakk, he also worked with other record producers, including Kanye West, Pharrell Williams and Mike Shinoda. Recording sessions took place at the 1st & 15th Studios in Chicago, Illinois, the Record Plant Studios in Hollywood, California and the Right Track Studios in New York City, New York. Prior to its release, Fiasco had to make "several last-minute changes" due to "sample issues".

Musical content

Subject matter
Food & Liquor contains elements of alternative hip hop. Fiasco covers a wide variety of subjects on the album. The opening track begins with Fiasco chanting the opening lines of the Qur'an in Arabic. The following track, "Real", is a reflection of "making music of which he doesn't have to be ashamed". "Kick, Push", the album's lead single, is about a young male and his love for skateboarding. The lyrics follow the skateboarder through many stages of his life such as his childhood, finding love, marriage, and adulthood. Although the literal meaning of this song is skateboarding, the actual meaning of the song is rejection, and being criticized for doing what one loves. On "The Instrumental", Fiasco addresses addiction to television. "He Say She Say" deals with the story of a single mother and a child lacking a father figure. "The Cool" follows the story of a dead gangster who rises from the grave and returns to the hood where he lived and died. With its "haunting keys and strings", "Hurt Me Soul" deals with displacement and alienation from his neighborhood. On "American Terrorist", Fiasco discusses the misconceptions of Islam in America. He also addresses the issues of racism and gun culture. The song had originally sampled a song by Chick Corea, but due to sampling issues, it was never cleared. For example, the song opens with,"We came through the storm, nooses on our necks, and a smallpox blanket to keep us warm." The album concludes with Lupe reading off an extensive appreciation list of people who helped with the album.

Production
Food & Liquor was handled by a variety of different producers; some lesser-known such as Prolyfic, Soundtrakk, Needlz and Craig Kallman, while also having tracks produced by well-known producers such as Kanye West, Mike Shinoda and The Neptunes. On "Kick, Push", Soundtrakk provided lush strings and horns as the backdrop. Strings are prominent through the album particularly on songs such as "Hurt Me Soul", "He Say She Say", and "Daydreamin'". "Daydreamin'" contains a sample of the well-known song "Daydream in Blue" as covered by I Monster as the chorus. "American Terrorist" contains a middle-eastern style beat provided by Prolyfic. The Neptunes provided a more synth and keyboard based beat on "I Gotcha". Brandon Howard provides a lush piano loop on "Kick, Push II".

Artwork
The album cover of Food & Liquor was designed by Chuck Anderson and Righteous Kung Fu. It was inspired by a skateboard deck Fiasco owned. The cover shows Fiasco floating in air, surrounded by several items, including a Banksy postcard, a Nintendo DS, a sketchbook, the Qur'an, and a robot. He explained that the items were picked out carefully, as they were things he "carr[ied] around every day". In the liner notes, Fiasco parodies drug dealing by replacing liquor with milk and cookies, and drive-by shootings by replacing guns with books.

Reception

Critical response

Food & Liquor received widespread acclaim from music critics. At Metacritic, which assigns a normalized rating out of 100 to reviews from mainstream critics, the album received an average score of 83, based on 20 reviews. Several writers lauded the lyrical content on the album. Nathan Rabin of The A.V. Club praised the album, saying that Fiasco "masterfully melds his peerless storytelling gifts with his idiosyncratic passion for skateboarding, fantasy, and incisive sociopolitical commentary". He also noted that Fiasco "boldly expand[ed] the parameters of mainstream hip-hop". Sarah Godfrey of The Washington Post hailed the album as a "masterpiece of responsible rap". Darryl Sterdan of Jam! called the album "one of the sharpest and smartest hip-hop discs" of 2006, while Andy Kellman of AllMusic argued that "Food and Liquor just might be the steadiest and most compelling rap album of 2006". Stylus Magazines Josh Love felt that it benefits greatly from Fiasco's impressive rapping and subtlety, which he found to be characteristics that are "incredibly rare in hip-hop in 2006". Sean Fennessey of Pitchfork was less enthusiastic and said that although Fiasco's raps are abundant with "wit and double meaning", the album's biggest flaw is his inability to write memorable hooks, which are instead "blandly-sung, unmemorable couplets".

Commercial performance
Food & Liquor debuted at number eight on the Billboard 200, selling 81,000 copies in its first week. As of January 2008, it went on to sell 325,000 copies in the United States, as of September 22 of 2021 the album is certified gold.

Accolades 
The album was named best hip hop album of 2006 by several publications and was ranked within several year-end lists. It was also one of the best-reviewed albums of 2006 at Metacritic. Food & Liquor finished 34th in the voting for the Pazz & Jop, an annual critics poll run by The Village Voice. Robert Christgau, the poll's creator, named it the 19th best album of the year in his own list.  The album was also included in the book 1001 Albums You Must Hear Before You Die.

The album earned Fiasco three nominations at the 2007 49th Grammy Awards: Best Rap Album, Best Rap Solo Performance and Best Rap Song for "Kick, Push". In 2008, "Daydreamin'" won the award for Best Urban/Alternative Performance at the 50th Grammy Awards.

Singles
The first international single off the album was "Kick, Push", a love story about two misfit skateboarders. The second single in Europe was "Daydreamin'" (featuring Jill Scott) which features a sample of I Monster's cover of "Daydream in Blue." The second single in the U.S. (and the third international single) was "I Gotcha" which is produced by The Neptunes. The song's video was featured on MTV's "Making the Video." Fiasco held a poll on his MySpace profile, where fans were able to vote for which song they wanted to be made into a music video.

Track listing

Note(s)
"The woman who recites the poem on the introduction is Ayesha Jaco, Lupe's sister. The same woman is also responsible for the poem in the introduction to "The Cool."

Sample credits
"Real" contains a sample of "How Does It Feel" by Harvey Mason
"Just Might Be O.K." contains a sample of "Humphrey's Overture" written by Paul Humphrey.
"Kick, Push" contains a sample of "Magtaksil Man Ikaw (Bolero Medley)" by Celeste Legaspi.
"The Instrumental" contains a sample of "Nestle" by Far.
"He Say, She Say" contains a sample of "The Last One to Be Loved" by Burt Bacharach and "Mesopotamia" by The B-52's.
"Sunshine" contains a sample of "Friend to Friend" by Diana Ross.
"Daydreamin'" contains a sample of "Daydream" by I Monster.
"The Cool" contains a sample of "Life on Mars" by Dexter Wansel and Funky Drummer" by James Brown.
"Hurt Me Soul" contains a sample of "Stay with Me" by Cecil Holmes.
"Pressure" contains a sample of "Pressure Cooker" by Thelma Houston.
"American Terrorist" contains a sample of "The Romantic Warrior" by Return to Forever.
"The Emperor's Soundtrack" contains a sample of "Between the Walls" by UFO.
"Theme Music to a Drive-By" contains a sample of "(Do It, Do It) No One Does It Better" by The Spinners.
"Carrera Lu"  contains a sample of "Bad Tune" by Earth, Wind & Fire.

Personnel
As listed on Allmusic.

 Mireya Acierto – photography
 Chuck Anderson – cover art
 James Auwarter – mixing, mixing assistant
 Craig Bauer – mixing
 Jeff Breakley – mixing assistant
 Chill – executive producer, management
 Andrew Coleman – engineer
 Bojan Dugich – engineer, mixing
 Lupe Fiasco – executive producer
 Patrick Fong – design
 Brian Gartner – vocal engineer
 Chris Gehringer – mastering
 Sarah Green – performer
 Brandon Howard – producer
 I Monster – producer
 Jay-Z – executive producer
 Chris Jennings – assistant engineer

 Darrale Jones – executive producer
 Craig Kallman – producer
 Greg Magers – engineer
 Jonah Matranga – performer
 The Neptunes – producer
 Ryan Neuschafer – mixing assistant
 Prolyfic – producer
 Will Quinell – mastering assistant
 Righteous Kung Fu – creative director, cover art
 Jason Salvador – management
 Matthew Santos – performer
 Mike Shinoda – producer
 Soundtrakk – producer
 Reed "Mountain Man" Taylor – assistant engineer
 Patrick Viala – mixing
 Kanye West – producer, consultant

Charts

Weekly charts

Year-end charts

Certifications

Notes

References

External links
 Lupe Fiasco's Food & Liquor at Metacritic
 

2006 debut albums
Atlantic Records albums
Albums produced by Mike Shinoda
Albums produced by Jay-Z
Albums produced by Kanye West
Albums produced by Lupe Fiasco
Albums produced by the Neptunes
Albums produced by Needlz
Lupe Fiasco albums